Carrie Baird is an American chef and businesswoman. She is a Top Chef alumna and restaurateur.

Education 
Baird went to Le Cordon Bleu for a culinary arts program and was mentored by Jennifer Jasinski.

Career
In 2016, Baird helped Natascha Hess start The Ginger Pig as a food truck. The following year she became head chef of Bar Dough.

In February 2020 she left Bar Dough and became co-owner and co-head chef with Natascha Hess at 'That’s What She Said.' The following month she added Rose’s Classic Americana (Rosetta Hall) to her restaurant repertoire. This opening happened seven days before coronavirus stay-at-home orders shuttered restaurants for dine-in service.

Television 
Baird participated in Season 15 (and was a judge in Season 18 In 2021). She was a judge in Top Chef: Portland in 2021 (season 18) This was the first time the show ever used an elite rotating judging and dining panel. She was a finalist in 2021 CADairy2Go in its cheese and mac category.

Recognition and acclaim 
In 2020, Baird was a finalist in the James Beard Foundation’s: Mountain category (winner was not announced due to the “dire situation” the foundation was in). She was included in Westword’s ‘Four people to watch in Denver’s Culinary Scene in 2021.'

Baird created the infamous pork sesame crunch on Ginger Pig’s happy hour menu and baked a cake after building a makeshift oven out of snow when the chefs were tasked with making a dish with camping equipment, cooking in outdoors Colorado.

References 

Top Chef contestants
American women chefs
American women restaurateurs
American restaurateurs
Living people
Year of birth missing (living people)
21st-century American women
Chefs from Colorado